João Miguel Torrão (born 25 May 1993) is a Portuguese dressage rider. He competed at the European Championships in 2019 and competed at the Olympic Games in Tokyo, where he finished 29th in the individual competition and 8th with the Portuguese Team. He holds also the Portuguese dressage records in the Grand Prix and Grand Prix Special with scoring over the 77% and 79% with his horse Equador.

References

Living people
1993 births
People from Évora
Portuguese male equestrians
Portuguese dressage riders
Equestrians at the 2020 Summer Olympics
Olympic equestrians of Portugal
Sportspeople from Évora District